This is a list of countries by barley production in 2016 based on the Food and Agriculture Organization Corporate Statistical Database.

The total world barley production for 2016 was 141,277,993 metric tonnes. In 2018, production was 170 million tonnes.

Production by country

>1,000,000 tonnes

100,000–1,000,000 tonnes

10,000–100,000 tonnes

1,000–10,000 tonnes

<1,000 tonnes

References
		

Lists of countries by production
Barley